Little Big Dream, is a 2016 Thai television film starring Puttichai Kasetsin (Push) and Worranit Thawornwong (Mook). The film, directed by Chatkaew Susiwa and produced by GMMTV, premiered in Thailand and originally aired on One31 on 5 December 2016. It later premiered on GMM 25 on 1 October 2017 as several entertainment programs were temporarily stopped for the month of October in preparation for the royal cremation ceremonies of Thai King Bhumibol Adulyadej.

Synopsis 
The story, made in honor of King Bhumibol Adulyadej (Rama IX), highlights the values of love and respect of teenagers to their parents just as how they show their respect to the King as the father of the nation through his teachings.

Cast and characters 
Below are the cast of the series:

Main 
 Puttichai Kasetsin (Push) as Phak
 Worranit Thawornwong (Mook) as Dream

Supporting 
 Nachat Juntapun (Nicky) as Peng
 Korawit Boonsri (Gun) as Poppi
 Oranicha Krinchai (Proud) as May
 Korapat Kirdpan (Nanon) as Phum
 Tipnaree Weerawatnodom (Namtan) as Mo
 Kunchanuj Kengkarnka (Kan)

Guest role 

 Prachaya Ruangroj (Singto)
 Perawat Sangpotirat (Krist)
 Pattadon Janngeon (Fiat)
 Korn Khunatipapisiri (Oaujun)
 Wachirawit Ruangwiwat (Chimon)
 Thitipoom Techaapaikhun (New)
 Atthaphan Phunsawat (Gun)
 Apichaya Saejung (Ciize)
 Ployshompoo Supasap (Jan)
 Thanaboon Wanlopsirinun (Na)
 Napasorn Weerayuttvilai (Puimek)
 Tawan Vihokratana (Tay)
 Harit Cheewagaroon (Sing)
 Thanat Lowkhunsombat (Lee)
 Alysaya Tsoi (Alice)
 Krittanai Arsalprakit (Nammon)
 Jirakit Kuariyakul (Toptap)
 Pirapat Watthanasetsiri (Earth)
 Jirakit Thawornwong (Mek)
 Jumpol Adulkittiporn (Off)
 Leo Saussay
 Sutthipha Kongnawdee (Noon)
 Nawat Phumphothingam (White)
 Chanagun Arpornsutinan (Gunsmile)
 Phurikulkrit Chusakdiskulwibul (Amp)

References

External links 
 Little Big Dream on GMM 25 website 
 

2016 television films
2016 films
Thai television films
GMM 25 original programming
One 31 original programming